Johannes Schmidt may refer to:

Johannes Schmidt (linguist) (1843–1901), German linguist
Johannes Schmidt (biologist) (1877–1933), Danish biologist
  (1908–1976), German Sturmbannführer

See also
Johann Schmidt (disambiguation)